Arbeit is a word of the German language which means "work" or "labour".

It is also a surname, and may refer to:

Arnold Arbeit (1911–1974), American artist and architect
Jochen Arbeit, German guitarist

See also
Arbeit macht frei, a German phrase meaning "work makes (you) free", known for being placed over Nazi concentration camps entrances
Work (disambiguation)
Labour (disambiguation)